YSR Kapu Nestham is a program launched by the Government of Andhra Pradesh on 24 June 2020 to financially assist below poverty line women from Kapu, Balija, Telaga and Ontari communities aged between 45 and 60 years by depositing ₹75000 in their bank accounts in the span of five years.

Development 
The scheme was launched by Chief minister of Andhra Pradesh Y. S. Jagan Mohan Reddy on 24 June 2020 with the initial budget of ₹354 Crores by depositing ₹15000 in the accounts of over 2.36 lakh women of Kapu, Balija, Telaga and Ontari communities.

Phase two of YSR Kapu Nestham was launched on 7 November 2020 where ₹143 Crores was deposited in the bank accounts of 95,345 women.

₹490.86 crores was disbursed into the bank accounts of 3,27,244 beneficiaries on 22 July 2021.

The scheme 
YSR Kapu Nestham was introduced to financially assist women aged 45–60 from Kapu, Balija, Telaga and Ontari communities with the total household income less than ₹10,000 in rural and ₹12,000 in urban areas.

People who own more than three acres of wet land or 10 acres of dry land are considered to be ineligible to avail the scheme.

References 

Government welfare schemes in Andhra Pradesh
Poverty in India